Sona Asatryan (born 26 April 1999) is an Armenian chess player who holds the FIDE title of Woman International Master (WIM).

Biography
Sona Asatryan was student of Ashtarak Chess School. In 2013, she won siler medal in Armenian Youth Chess Championship in the U14 girls age group. In 2017, Sona Asatryan won Armenian Women's Chess Championship 1st league.

She has repeatedly represented Armenia at European Youth Chess Championships and World Youth Chess Championships, where she won European Youth Chess Championship in 2017 in the U18 girls age group. In 2017, she was awarded the FIDE Woman International Master (WIM) title.

References

External links

1999 births
Living people
Armenian female chess players
Chess Woman International Masters